Patrick Redmond (born 1966) is an English author of psychological thrillers; typical themes include insanity, secrets and death. He attended Felsted School, then studied law at Leicester University and British Columbia in Vancouver. Before becoming a writer, he worked for eight years as a solicitor in London.

Bibliography
The Wishing Game (1999), also published as Something Dangerous
The Puppet Show (2000)
Apple of My Eye (2003)
All She Ever Wanted (2006)
The Replacement (2014)
The Night Visitor (2018)

References

External links
Author's website

1966 births
Alumni of the University of Leicester
Living people
English male writers